The Fast Adaptive and Secure Protocol (FASP) is a proprietary data transfer protocol. FASP is a network-optimized network protocol developed by Aspera, owned by IBM. The associated client/server software packages are also commonly called Aspera. The technology is patented under US Patent #20090063698, Method and system for aggregate bandwidth control.

Similar to the connectionless UDP protocol, FASP does not expect any feedback on every packet sent. Only the packets marked as really lost must be requested again by the recipient. As a result, it does not suffer as much loss of throughput as TCP does on networks with high latency or high packet loss.

Large organizations like IBM, the European Nucleotide Archive, the US National Institutes of Health National Center for Biotechnology Information and others use the protocol in different areas. Amazon also wants to use the protocol for uploading to data centers.

Security

FASP has built-in security mechanisms that do not affect the transmission speed. The encryption algorithms used are based exclusively on open standards. Before the transfer, SSH is used for key exchange for authentication. These randomly generated, one-way keys are discarded at the end of the transmission.

The data is optionally encrypted or decrypted immediately before sending and receiving with the AES-128. To counteract attacks by monitoring the encrypted information during long transfers, the AES is operated in cipher feedback mode with a random, public initialization vector for each block. In addition, an integrity check of each data block takes place, in which case, for example, a man-in-the-middle attack would be noticed.

Protocol
FASP's control port is TCP port 22 the same port that SSH uses. For data transfer, it begins at UDP port 33001, which increments with each additional connection thread.

FASP's flow control algorithm, unlike TCP's, completely ignores packet drops. Instead, it acts on changes in measured packet delivery time. When that is growing, queues are getting longer and channel bandwidth is exceeded; falling, queues are getting shorter. Acting on this information is complicated because the receiver has it and the sender needs it, but its lifetime is often less than the transmission delay; and measurements are noisy. Thus, the sender uses a predictive filter fed updates from the receiver.

The transmission rate is chosen to match and not exceed the channel bandwidth, and trigger no drops. By contrast, TCP slowly increases its rate until it sees a packet drop and falls back, interpreting any drop as congestion. On a channel with long delay and frequent packet loss, TCP never approaches the actual bandwidth available. FASP cooperates with TCP flows on the same channel, using up bandwidth TCP leaves unused.

See also
 Tsunami UDP Protocol 
 UDP-based Data Transfer Protocol (UDT)
 QUIC
 GridFTP

References

Internet protocols
Internet Standards
Transport layer protocols